Year 1076 (MLXXVI) was a leap year starting on Friday (link will display the full calendar) of the Julian calendar.

Events 
 By place 

 Europe 
 January 24 – Synod of Worms: Emperor Henry IV holds a synod in Worms (modern Germany). The assembly declares Pope Gregory VII deposed, and the bishops abandon their allegiance to him.
 February 22 – Gregory VII pronounces a sentence of excommunication against Henry IV at Rome. He is excluded from the Catholic Church, and all the bishops named by Henry are excommunicated.
 Summer – Dirk V, count of Holland, re-conquers West Frisia (modern Netherlands) from the Archdiocese of Utrecht. He besieges Bishop Conrad at the castle of IJsselmonde – taking him prisoner.
 October 8 – Demetrius Zvonimir is crowned as king of Croatia in Solin (near Split), in the Basilica of Saint Peter and Moses (known today as the Hollow Church) by a representative of Gregory VII.
 December 13 – Norman Conquest of Southern Italy: Italo-Norman forces under Robert Guiscard de Hauteville and Richard I of Capua, conquer the fortress city of Salerno – after a short siege.
 December 26 – Bolesław II (the Generous) is crowned as king of Poland by Archbishop Bogumił in the Gniezno Cathedral. Bolesław supports Gregory VII in his conflict against Henry IV.

 England 
 May 31 – Waltheof, one of the earls of an uprising against King William I (the Conqueror), is beheaded near Winchester (see Revolt of the Earls).
 The Trial of Penenden Heath is held, with an important ruling regarding land rights, subsequent to the Norman Conquest (approximate date).
 November 1 – In England, a frost begins that lasts until April 1077.

 Africa 
 Koumbi Saleh, an important mercantile and political center of the Ghana Empire (modern Mauritania), is besieged by the Almoravids (approximate date).

 Asia 
 Vikramaditya VI deposes his older brother Someshvara II, and becomes king of the Western Chalukya Empire (modern India).

 By topic 

 Literature 
 Anselm of Aosta, an Italian Benedictine abbot, completes the Monologion (or Monoloque) at the request of his fellow monks.

 Religion 
 Demetrius Zvonimir donates the Benedictine monastery of St. Gregory in Vrana to Gregory VII.

Births 
 June 1 – Mstislav I (the Great), Grand Prince of Kiev (d. 1132)
 Abu Bakr ibn al-Arabi, Moorish scholar and judge (d. 1148)
 Fujiwara no Sadazane, Japanese calligrapher (d. 1120)
 Hualani, Hawaiian queen and regent (approximate date)
 Urban (or Gwrgan), bishop of Llandaff (d. 1134)

Deaths 
 March 18 – Ermengarde of Anjou, duchess of Burgundy
 March 21 – Robert I (the Old), duke of Burgundy (b. 1011)
 April 18 – Beatrice of Bar, French duchess and regent
 April 28 – Sweyn II (Estridsson), king of Denmark
 May 8 – Nasr ibn Mahmud, Mirdasid emir of Aleppo 
 May 26 – Ramon Berenguer I, count of Barcelona (b. 1023)
 May 31 – Waltheof, earl of Northumbria (executed)
 June 4 – Sancho IV, king of Pamplona (or Navarre)
 July 15 – Arnost (or Arnošt), bishop of Rochester
 Godfrey IV (the Hunchback), duke of Lower Lorraine
 Ramihrdus of Cambrai, French priest and martyr (or 1077)
 William Busac, English nobleman (jure uxoris) (b. 1020)

References